Antony Lopez may refer to:

Antony Lopez Peralta (born 1981), French footballer
Antony Lopez (darts player) (born 1987), Gibraltarian darts player

See also
Tony Lopez (disambiguation)
 Anthony Lopes (born 1990), Portuguese professional footballer who plays as a goalkeeper
Antonio Lopez (disambiguation)